Goat water, also referred to as kiddy stew, is a stew that is a part of the national cuisine of the Caribbean island of Montserrat It has been described as a national dish of Montserrat. It has also been described as a national stew.

Goat water is prepared using goat meat, onions, herbs and chible (scallions/spring onions and thyme), ketchup, hot green pepper, salt and pepper to taste, garlic, cloves, oil, water, marjoram, ground mace and flour. It is sometimes served with rice or crispy bread rolls. The dish has been described as spicy and flavorful.

Origin
Goat water was adapted from Irish stew in Ireland.

History
In the past goat water was referred to as kiddy stew.

See also

 Caribbean cuisine
 List of stews

References

Caribbean cuisine
National dishes
Montserratian culture
Stews